Ronald James Hookway (1917–1982) was a United Kingdom greyhound trainer. He was the UK champion trainer in 1965 and 1967.

Profile
Jim Hookway trained at Owlerton Stadium in Sheffield. His first significant feat was reaching the 1954 Oaks final with Rimmells Pearl. In 1955 he then trained St Leger and Cesarewitch finalists.

His first major classic success came in 1965, when he won the Scottish Greyhound Derby; securing a 1-2 finish with Clonmannon Flash and O'Leary.

Hookway became Trainer of the Year in 1965 and 1967 and won the sports ultimate accolade when winning the 1967 English Greyhound Derby with Tric-Trac. Spectre II finished runner-up in the same final and won the BBC Sportsview Television Trophy.

He later won the 1970 Cesarewitch and also won three All England Cups.

Personal life
Before the Second World War he was a Wire Scourer. He married Winifred Innocent in 1949.

References 

1917 births
1982 deaths
British greyhound racing trainers